The Second Curtin ministry (Labor) was the 30th ministry of the Government of Australia. It was led by the country's 14th Prime Minister, John Curtin. The Second Curtin ministry succeeded the First Curtin ministry, which dissolved on 21 September 1943 following the federal election that took place in August. The ministry was replaced by the Forde ministry on 6 July 1945 following the death of Curtin - the second of three occasions where a sitting Prime Minister died in office.

Frank Forde, who died in 1983, was the last surviving member of the Second Curtin ministry; Forde was also the last surviving minister of the Scullin government, First Curtin ministry, Forde government, and the First Chifley ministry.

Ministry

See also
 First Curtin Ministry

References

Ministries of George VI
Curtin, 2
Australian Labor Party ministries
1943 establishments in Australia
1945 disestablishments in Australia
Cabinets established in 1943
Cabinets disestablished in 1945